The Halmahera blossom bat (Syconycteris carolinae) is a species of megabat in the family Pteropodidae. It is endemic to Halmahera and Bacan islands, of the northern Maluku Islands archipelago in Indonesia.

It is an IUCN Red List Near Threatened species. A 2017 study ranked the species as the 8th highest research priority among island endemic bats based on conservation situation and current data availability.

References

Halmahera blossom
Halmahera blossom bat
Endemic fauna of Indonesia
Halmahera blossom bat
Halmahera blossom bat
Vulnerable fauna of Asia
Halmahera blossom bat
Taxonomy articles created by Polbot